Dundaga Municipality is a former municipality in Courland, Latvia. The municipality was formed in 2009 by merging Dundaga parish and Kolka parish, the administrative centre being Dundaga. As of 2020, the population was 3,571.

On 1 July 2021, Dundaga Municipality ceased to exist and its territory was merged into Talsi Municipality.

Notable sites 
 Dundaga Castle

See also 
 Administrative divisions of Latvia (2009)

References 

 
Former municipalities of Latvia